Daniel O. Gimadu (called Dan) was an Anglican bishop in Uganda: he was Bishop of North Mbale from 2006 to  2014.

References

21st-century Anglican bishops in Uganda
Anglican bishops of North Mbale
Uganda Christian University alumni